Kaukauna High School is a public high school in Kaukauna, Wisconsin, the only high school in the Kaukauna Area School District. As of the 2016–2017 school year, the school had 1,181 students in grades 9 through 12.

The first Kaukauna High School, built in the late 19th century, was expanded twice and replaced with a new building on a different site in 1999; the old building is now River View Middle School. The school is building a sports complex with an indoor workout facility and a new stadium with turf field, plus a new concession stand built by the Kaukauna Soccer program.

Athletics
Kaukauna High participates in the Fox Valley Association Conference with nine other Fox Valley schools. The school's mascot is the Galloping Ghost, named after a football game in the early days of the school.  On a foggy night, the announcer was heard to describe the running back as a Galloping Ghost - possibly a reference to Red Grange, a professional football player whose nickname was "The Galloping Ghost".

Boys'
D2 Football
D2 Baseball
D1 Wrestling
D2 Soccer
D2 Basketball
D2 Golf
D1 Track and Field
D1 Cross Country
Tennis
Boys Volleyball
Woodworking

Notable alumni
William J. Duffy, Wisconsin jurist and legislator
Lee Meyerhofer, Wisconsin legislator
Arnold C. Otto, Wisconsin legislator
Red Smith, NFL and MLB player
David Viaene, NFL player

References

Educational institutions established in 1999
Schools in Outagamie County, Wisconsin
Public high schools in Wisconsin
1999 establishments in Wisconsin